Natasha Barrett (March 1972, Norwich, England) is a British contemporary music composer specialising in electroacoustic art music. Her compositional aesthetics are derived from acousmatic issues. In addition to acousmatic concert music, she composes for instruments, live electronics, sound installations, multi-media works, real-time computer music improvisation, has made soundscapes for exhibitions, and music for contemporary dance and theater. Since 2000 her work has been influenced by spatialisation as a musical parameter, and the projection of 3-D sound-fields. She currently lives in Norway.

Natasha Barrett began working seriously with electroacoustic composition during a master's degree in analysis and electroacoustic composition, studying with Jonty Harrison at the University of Birmingham (UK). This study also gave her the opportunity to work with BEAST (Birmingham ElectroAcoustic Sound Theatre) which influenced her later work, and lead on to a doctoral degree in composition supervised by Denis Smalley, awarded in 1998 at City University (London, UK). Both degrees were funded by the Humanities section of the British Academy. In the same year, a grant from Norges forskningsråd (The Research Council of Norway) enabled her to work for one year as a resident composer at NoTAM (Norsk nettverk for Teknologi, Akustikk og Musikk / Norwegian network for Technology, Acoustics and Music) in Oslo (Norway). She is now a freelance composer, sound-artist and researcher, based in Oslo.

Her work has received many awards, including the Nordic Council Music Prize for 2006, the Giga-Hertz Prize, Germany (2008), the first prize at Musica Nova (Prague, Czech Republic, 2001), Noroit-Léonce Petitot (Arras, France, 1998), first prizes (1998 and 2001) and finalist (2008) in the Trivium section of the Bourges International Electroacoustic Music Competition (France), Euphonie D'Or des Concours International de Musique Electroacoustique, Bourges 1992–2002, Jury and public first prizes in the 9th Prix international Noroit-Léonce Petitot, Arras, France (1998).
, finalist in the same competition in 1995, Musica Nova Electroacoustic Music Competition, Czech Republic (2001). Concurso Internacional de Música Eletroacústica de São Paulo (IV CIMESP, Brazil, 2001), Concours SCRIME (France, 2000), Festival Internacional de Nuevas Tecnologías, Arte y Comunicación Ciber@RT / Ciber@RT International Festival of New Technologies, Art and Communication (Spain, 2000), Concours Luigi Russolo (Italy, 1998, 1995), an honorary mention at Prix Ars Electronica (Linz, Austria, 1998), 9th International Rostrum for electoacoustic music (2002) and Edvardprisen (2004) Norway.

She receives commissions from institutions and performers in Europe and America, and her work is available on numerous CD labels.

In addition to composing, she is joint director and performer in the spatial music performance group EAU (Electric Audio Unit) has worked as a researcher in 3-D music and movement at the Department for Musicology, University of Oslo (2014–2016) has worked as a 20% researcher in sound design at the Oslo School of Architecture (2011–2014) as associate professor in electroacoustic music and music technology at the Music Conservatory (2000) and is currently employed in a 50% associate professorship in composition at the Norwegian State Academy for Music.

Partial discography
 Puzzlewood (Aurora, 2017)
Peat + Polymer (double CD, +3DB, 3DB 021, 2014, Norway)
Bouteilles de Klein (DVD-a empreintes DIGITALes, IMED 10104/105 2010, Canada)
Black Bile Extempore (Barrett & Östersjö) (CD, Elektron, EM 2012, 2009, Sweden)
DR.OX (CD, C74 Records, C74 013, 2008, USA)
Trade Winds (SACD, Aurora, ACD 5056, 2007, Norway)
Kraftfelt (DVD-Audio, Aurora, ACD 5037, 2005, Norway)
Isostasie (CD, empreintes DIGITALes, IMED 0262, 2002, Canada)
Chillies & Shells (CD, Nota Bene Records, NB 970101M, 1998, UK)
Rocks & Wraiths (CD, Nota Bene Records, NB 970101M, 1997, UK)

Her work also appears as tracks on twelve other CDs.

Partial list of works

References

External links
Official Natasha Barrett website
http://www.electrocd.com/en/bio/barrett_na/ (with permission)
Natasha Barrett at exclaim
Natasha Barrett is a member of the Norwegian Society of Composers

1972 births
21st-century classical composers
Alumni of the University of Birmingham
British classical composers
Electroacoustic music composers
Women classical composers
Living people
Norwegian classical composers
English women in electronic music
21st-century English women musicians
21st-century women composers